Shri M.N. Kaul (16 September 1901 – 20 November 1984) was Secretary of 1st Lok Sabha, 2nd Lok Sabha and Secretary-General of 3rd Lok Sabha (Lower House of Parliament of India).  He was appointed Secretary of Lok Sabha Constituted after the First General Election of Lok Sabha in India. He retired on 31 August 1964 at the age of 63 and after 17 years of service as Secretary.

Early life and career
He was born in Kashmir and studied at University of Cambridge and London School of Economics. He also practised as a lawyer at Allahabad High Court.

Positions held
 Editor, Allahabad Law Journal 1927-37
 Secretary, Constituent Assembly (Legislative) 1947-50
 Secretary, Provisional Parliament 1950-52 and
 Secretary, Lok Sabha 1952-64
 Nominated to Rajya Sabha in April 1966
 Re-Nominated to Rajya Sabha in 1970
 Director-General of the Institute of Constitution and Parliamentary Studies 1973.

Selected publications
Parliamentary Procedure Since Independence
Parliamentary Institutions and Procedures
Practice and Procedure of Parliament (with S.L. Shakdhar)
Impressions of China
Report of the Tokyo I.P.C., 1960 and impressions of the visit to Japan
Impressions of the Visit to the U.A.R, East European Countries and Russia
Growth of Position and Powers of the Speaker and
Conversations on Parliamentary Practice and Procedure (3 volumes)

References

 Kashyap, Subhash C.  (1989) The Office of the Secretary-General - Monograph Series (New Delhi: Lok Sabha Sectt., pp. 23–24)

External links

People from Jammu and Kashmir
1901 births
1984 deaths
Nominated members of the Rajya Sabha
Secretaries General of the Lok Sabha